The 1951 New South Wales Rugby Football League premiership was the forty-fourth season of Sydney’s top-level rugby league competition, Australia’s first. Ten teams from across the city competed for the newly created J. J. Giltinan Shield during the season which culminated in a grand final between South Sydney and Manly-Warringah.

Season summary
South Sydney ascended to the minor premiership with relative ease in 1951, losing only one match during the season to finish the regular season ahead by a record eleven-point margin.

Teams

Ladder

Finals
Odds-on favourites to retain the premiership, Souths reserved their worst performance of the year for the semifinal against St. George being trounced 35–8. This loss meant that a grand final would be necessary to determine the season's premiers.  The next week, the Dragons were beaten by a gutsy Manly side in a preliminary final, 18–8. The infant Manly club thus qualified for its first grand final only five seasons after having entered the League in 1947.

Grand Final

Manly were without former Test star and captain-coach Wally O'Connell who had a fractured bone in his wrist. The Sea Eagles were instead captained by hooker Kevin Schubert. Gordon Willoughby played out the match with his leg heavily strapped rather than leave his side further depleted but Manly’s hopes of upsetting the defending premiers were shattered in a spectacular display of attacking rugby league by Souths.

 The smallest crowd for a final since 1944 was on hand at the Sports Ground to witness a one-sided game which Souths won 42–14. A highlight of the record win was Test winger John Graves’ four tries in the match – the only time this has been achieved in grand final history. Souths 42 points remains the highest score made in a Grand Final. 

Souths scored first through Bernie Purcell and led 15–4 at the break. They then piled on twenty-seven points in the second-half. Tries to Clive Churchill, Ray Mason, Jack Rayner and Chick Cowie added to Graves' record haul. The Rabbitohs pack, led by front rower Denis Donoghue, dominated Manly’s forwards with Ernie Hammerton giving his team a feast of possession. Bernie Purcell landed seven goals from nine attempts and was also dynamic in attack, being chosen by The Sunday Herald judge, Frank McMillan as the man-of-the-match, for which he received a £10 reward.

Other records set that day include the most combined points scored in a grand final (56 total); the most tries scored by one team in a grand final (8), (a mark later matched by Eastern Suburbs in 1975 Grand Final, and Manly Warringah Sea Eagles in the 2008 NRL Grand Final), the most goals scored in grand final by the winning team (9) and the most total combined goals scored in a Grand Final (13).

South Sydney Rabbitohs 42
Tries: Graves (4), Churchill, Mason, Rayner, CowieGoals: Purcell (7), Hammerton, Donoghue.

Manly-Warringah Sea Eagles 14
Tries: Lumsden (2)Goals: Rowles (4)

Player statistics
The following statistics are as of the conclusion of Round 18.

Top 5 point scorers

Top 5 try scorers

Top 5 goal scorers

References

External links
 Rugby League Tables - Season 1951 AFL Tables
 List of Season Results Hunterlink List
 Whiticker, Alan (1992), Grand Finals of the New South Wales Rugby League, Gary Allen,  Sydney
 Results:1951-1960 at rabbitohs.com.au
 1951 J J Giltinan Shield at rleague.com
 MSWRFL season 1951 at rugbyleagueproject.org
 Doran&searchLimits=1951 coaches

New South Wales Rugby League premiership
NSWRFL Season